Changsha Aeronautical Vocational and Technical College is a university located in Changsha, Hunan, China. The university covers a total area of 800 mu, with more than 300,000 square meters of floor space.

As of fall 2014, the university has one campus, a combined student body of 9,200 students, 389 faculty members.

History
It was formed in 1973 and initially called "PLA 5712 Factory Technical School". In 2002, Changsha Factory School merged into the university.

Academics
The university consists of 6 departments:

 Department of Aeronautical Engineering
 Department of Mechanical Manufacturing Engineering
 Department of Electrical and Electronic Engineering
 Department of Chemical Engineering and Information Engineering
 Department of Economic and Trade
 Department of Administrative Engineering

Culture
 Motto:

References

External links

Universities and colleges in Hunan
Educational institutions established in 1973
Education in Changsha
Universities and colleges in Changsha